Mont Mirantin is a mountain of Savoie, France. It lies in the Beaufortain Massif range.

Mountains of the Alps
Mountains of Savoie